Crotoneae is a tribe of the subfamily Crotonoideae, under the family Euphorbiaceae. It comprises five genera.

See also
 Taxonomy of the Euphorbiaceae

References

 
Euphorbiaceae tribes